Karen Karovich Karagezyan (born October 6, 1935, Moscow) is a Soviet and Russian journalist, translator, writer, the deputy head of the press office at The Gorbachev Foundation.In different years he was the press secretary, advisor and assistant of Mikhail Gorbachev.

Biography
Karagezyan was born on October 6, 1935, in Moscow. In 1953 after leaving the secondary school # 557 he entered the faculty of translation at the first Moscow state pedagogical institute of foreign languages. His speciality was a teacher and a translator of German.

He worked as a teacher at that institute for four years and later worked as a professional translator at the Institute of Social Sciences in Moscow.

In 1959–1960 he studied as an exchange student at Heidelberg University, the Department of German Studies.

In 1964 he began to work as a journalist. He was the editor, observer, head of the department of European countries, an editorial board member of the weekly magazine "Za rubezhom".

In 1977 he began to work for the political weekly "The New Times". He was sent to Bonn as a correspondent where worked till 1982. In 1982 he returned to Moscow where he continued his work as an observer for the magazine "The New Times".

In 1983 he was invited to work for a newly formed department of international information at the Central Committee of the Communist Party of the Soviet Union which was part of the Ideological Department.

In the early 1991 he was accepted for employment at the Press Service of the President of the USSR in Kremlin.

Since the February 1992 he has worked for the Service of International Contacts and Contacts with the Press at the International Foundation for Socio-Economic and Political Studies (The Gorbachev Foundation). He is engaged in contacts of the Foundation with German partners, accompanies the President of the Foundation in his trips to Germany.

He is a counselor of the chairman of the coordination committee of the forum of civil societies of Russia and Germany "Petersburg's dialogue".

In 2006 he took part in the round table discussion "The breakup of the Soviet Union: reasons and consequences” within the framework of “The Gorbachev Readings”.

He is the author of some books and numerous publications in Russian and foreign mass media. In 2016 together with V.A. Polyakov he published a book "Gorbachev in life".

In October 2019, he became an invited guest-expert in the filming of the documentary "Star of Raisa", dedicated to Raisa Gorbachev.

Bibliography
 Karagezyan K.K. The 25th anniversary of the republic // Sputnik Publ., 1974. – p. 17 (in Russian).
 Karagezyan K.K. Revanchism – an illusion or a real threat. – Moscow: Agenstvo pechati “Novosti” Publ., 1984. – 56 p. (in Russian).
 Karagezyan K.K., Polyakov V.A. Gorbachev in life. – Moscow: Ves Mir Publ., 2016. – 726 p. (in Russian).
 Karagezyan K.K., Polyakov V.A. Gorbachev in life.2nd edition. – Moscow: Ves Mir Publ., 2017. – 751 p. (in Russian).

References

Living people
1935 births
Soviet journalists
Soviet translators
Soviet writers
Russian writers